Paul Ngadjadoum (born 20 October 1957) is a Chadian former high jumper who competed in the 1988 Summer Olympics.

References

1957 births
Living people
Chadian male high jumpers
Olympic athletes of Chad
Athletes (track and field) at the 1988 Summer Olympics
African Games gold medalists for Chad
African Games medalists in athletics (track and field)
World Athletics Championships athletes for Chad
Athletes (track and field) at the 1978 All-Africa Games